Non-Hispanic whites or non-Latino whites are Americans who are classified by the United States Census as "white" and are not of Hispanic heritage. The United States Census Bureau defines white to include European Americans, Middle Eastern Americans, and North African Americans. Americans of European ancestry are divided into various ethnic groups and more than half of the white population are German, Irish, Scottish, English, Italian, French and Polish Americans. In the United States, this population was first derived from English (and, to a lesser degree, French) settlement of the America, as well as settlement by other Europeans such as the Germans and Dutch that began in the 17th century (see History of the United States). Continued growth since the early 19th century is attributed to sustained very high birth rates alongside relatively low death rates among settlers and natives alike as well as periodically massive immigration from European countries, especially Germany, Ireland, England, Italy, Greece, the Netherlands, France and Wales, as well as Poland, Russia, and many more countries. It typically refers to an English-speaking American in distinction to Spanish speakers in Mexico and the Southwestern states. In some parts of the country, the term Anglo-American is used to refer to non-Hispanic white English speakers as distinct from Spanish and Portuguese speakers although the term is more frequently used to refer to people of British or English descent and might include white people of Hispanic descent who no longer speak Spanish.

History 
The first Europeans who came to present United States or Canada were Norse explorers around the year 1000; however, they were ultimately absorbed or killed off, leaving no permanent settlements behind. Later, Pilgrims and colonists came in the 1600s along the East Coast, mainly from England, in search of economic opportunities and religious freedom. Over time emigrants from Europe settled the coastal regions developing a commercial economy. Between one-half and two-thirds of white immigrants to the American colonies between the 1630s and American Revolution had come as indentured servants. The total number of European immigrants to all 13 colonies before 1775 was about 500,000; of these 55,000 were involuntary prisoners. Of the 450,000 or so European arrivals who came voluntarily, an estimated 48% were indentured.

By the time of American Revolution there were about 2.5 million whites in the colonies. The white population was largely of English, Irish, Scotch-Irish, Scottish, German, Dutch and French Huguenot descent at the time. Between the revolution and the 1820s there was relatively little immigration to the United States. Starting after the 1820s large scale migration to the United States began and lasted until the 1920s. Many of the newcomers were Catholics of Irish, Italian, and Polish descent which lead to a nativist backlash. Some Americans worried about the growing Catholic population and wanted to maintain the United States as an Anglo Saxon Protestant nation. Over the course of the 19th and early 20th century European mass emigration to the United States and high birthrates grew the white population. After the American Revolution, white Americans settled the entire nation west of Appalachian Mountains, ultimately displacing the Natives and populating the entire country by the late 19th century. All immigration to the United States declined markedly between the mid 1920s until the 1960s due to a combination of immigration laws, The Great Depression, and The Second World War. Waves of Jewish, Syrian, and Lebanese immigration also occurred around this time.

Since 1965 white migration to the United States has been relatively minor compared to other racial and ethnic groups. During the 1990s there was a moderate increase from former communist countries in Eastern Europe. At the same time birthrates amongst whites have fallen below replacement level.

Culture 

White Americans have developed their own music, art, cuisine, fashion, and political economy largely based on a combination of traditional European ones. Most religious white Americans are Christian. Many Europeans often Anglicized their names and over time most Europeans adopted English as their primary language and intermarried with other white groups.

Population stagnation and decline 

The falling percentage of non-Latino/Hispanic white Americans is due to multiple factors:

1. Non-European Immigration. The United States has the largest number of immigrants in the world with the vast majority coming from countries where the population is of non-white and/or Latin American origin. Immigration to the United States from European countries has been in a steady decline since World War II averaging 56% of all immigrants in the 1950s and declining to 35% of all immigrants in the 1960s, 20% in the 1970s, 11% in the 1980s, 14% in the 1990s, and 13% in the 2000s. In 2009, approximately 90% of all immigrants came from non-European countries. The United States does receive a small number of non-Latino white immigrants, mainly from countries such as Canada, Poland, Russia, and the UK.

2. Intermarriage. The United States is seeing an unprecedented increase in intermarriage between the various racial and ethnic groups. In 2008, a record 14.6% of all new marriages in the United States were between spouses of a different race or ethnicity from one another. 9% of non-Latino whites who married in 2008 married either a non-white or Latino. Among all newlyweds in 2008, intermarried pairings were primarily white-Latino of any race (41%) as compared to white-Asian (15%), white-black (11%), and other combinations (33%). Other combinations consists of pairings between different minority groups, multi-racial people, and Native Indigenous Americans. The children of such unions would not automatically be classified as white non-Latino. Note that one self-identifies his or her racial and/or ethnic category.

3. Methodology. In the 2000 Census, people were allowed to check more than one race in addition to choosing "Latino". There was strong opposition to this from some civil rights activists who feared that this would reduce the size of various racial minorities. The government responded by counting those who are white and of one minority race or ethnicity as minorities for the purposes of civil-rights monitoring and enforcement. Hence one could be 1/8th black and still be counted as a minority. Also, because this does not apply to Latino origin (one is either Latino or not, but cannot be both Latino and non-Latino), the offspring of Latinos and non-Latinos are usually counted as Latino. In 2017, the Pew Research Center reported that high intermarriage rates and declining Latin American immigration has led to 11% of US adults with Latino ancestry (5.0 million people) to no longer identify as Latino. First-generation immigrants from Latin America identify themselves as "Latino" at a very high rate (97%), which slowly falls in each succeeding generation (in the second generation, to 92%; in the third, to 77%; and in the fourth, to 50%).

4. Attrition. Minority populations are younger than non-Latino whites. The national median age in 2011 was 37.3 years, with non-Latino whites having the oldest median age (42.3); by contrast, Latinos had the youngest median age (27.6). Non-Latino blacks (32.9) and non-Latino Asians (35.9) also are younger than whites. In 2013, the Census Bureau reported that for the first time, due to the more advanced age profile of the non-Latino white population, non-Latino whites died at a faster rate than non-Latino white births.

Although non-Latino whites are declining as a percentage, in actual numbers they have still been growing. From 2000 - 2010 the non-Latino white population grew from 194,552,774 to 196,817,552. This was a growth of 1.2% over the 10-year period, due to residual population momentum.

In 2011, for the first time in American history, non-Hispanic whites accounted for fewer than half of the births in the country, with 49.6% of total births. This rebounded to over 50% by 2016 according to the NCHIS and was still over 50% as of 2019. In addition to this, between 2016-2019, the birthrate of Latinos dropped by exactly twice as much as that of non-Latino whites (0.07 vs. 0.14). Before 2016, at least, 50% of children under age one had at least one parent of color or at least one parent who is white Latino.

Population by settlement 

In 2020, in 36 out of the 50 US states, non-Latino whites made up a greater percentage of the state's population than the US overall share of 57.8%; however, the 14 states with greater shares of non-whites include the four most populous states (California, Texas, New York, and Florida). The total non-Latino white population shrunk between 2010 and 2020 in 34 out of the 50 states, and the relative share of non-Latino whites in the overall state population has declined in all 50 states during that same time period.

As of 2020, six states are majority-minority: Hawaii, California, New Mexico, Texas, Nevada, and Maryland. All of these states saw larger declines in the relative share of their non-Latino white populations between 1990-2020 than the national average of -23.5% with Nevada dropping by -41.7%, California by -39.3% and Texas by -34.5%.

Historical population by state or territory

See also 

 Race and ethnicity in the United States census
 Anglo
 Emigration from Europe
 European Americans
 Stereotypes of white Americans
 White Americans
 White Anglo-Saxon Protestant
 White ethnic
 White Latino Americans
 White Southerners
 White demographic decline
 List of U.S. states by non-Hispanic white population
 List of U.S. cities with non-Hispanic white plurality populations in 2010

References 

Ethnography
European-American society
White Americans
Middle Eastern American
Ethnic groups in the United States